The Diocese of Durham is a Church of England diocese, based in Durham, and covering the historic county of Durham (and therefore including the part of Tyne and Wear south of the River Tyne, and excluding southern Teesdale). It was created in AD 635 as the Diocese of Lindisfarne. The cathedral is Durham Cathedral and the bishop is the Bishop of Durham who used to live at Auckland Castle, Bishop Auckland, and still has his office there. The diocese's administrative centre, the Diocesan Office, is located at Cuthbert House, Stonebridge just outside Durham City. This was opened in 2015.

History

Origins
The line of bishops of Durham stretches back to the 10th century, when Aldhun, Bishop of Lindisfarne (995–1018), transferred his see to Durham around 995. The diocese was founded, with its See at Lindisfarne, in 635; until the See was removed from there around 875 and translated to Chester-le-Street (Cuncacestre) in around 882.

The Bishop owes his unique position to the 7th and 8th century Kingdom of Northumbria, which stretched from the Humber estuary to the Firth of Forth. Subsequently the Kingdom came under Danish and English sovereignty and was transformed into an Earldom.

When William the Conqueror became king of England in 1066, he soon realised the need to control Northumbria to protect his kingdom from Scottish incursions. He gained the allegiance of both the Bishop of Durham and the Earl of Northumbria by confirming their privileges and acknowledging the remote independence of Northumbria.

To quell rebellions, William installed Robert Comine, a Norman noble, as the Earl of Northumbria, but Comine and his 700 men were massacred in Durham. In revenge, the King raided Northumbria in the Harrying of the North. Aethelwine, the Anglo-Saxon Bishop of Durham, tried to flee with Northumbrian treasures, but was caught and imprisoned. He later died in confinement, leaving his see vacant for William to the King to appoint Walcher as bishop of Durham in 1071.

Prince-Bishops
The King also appointed Waltheof, an Anglo-Saxon of the old Northumbria house, as the new Earl. Bishop William was on friendly terms with Earl Waltheof, who built a castle at Durham for the bishop. After another rebellion, Waltheof was executed in 1075 and in his place Walcher was appointed Earl, becoming the first Prince Bishop. Walcher was well-intentioned but proved an incompetent leader. He was murdered in Gateshead in 1081.

King William Rufus divided the Earldom into two parts: the lands north of the rivers Tyne and Derwent were ruled by the Earls of Northumberland, while the lands south of the rivers were put under the control of the Bishop of Durham.

The lands ruled by the bishops became known as the 'County Palatine of Durham', a defensive buffer zone between England and the Northumbria-Scottish borderland. Due to its strategic importance and its remoteness from London, the County Palatinate became a virtually autonomous entity, in which the Prince-Bishop possessed the powers of a King. Specifically, the Prince-Bishops had the authority to

 hold their own parliaments
 raise their own armies
 appoint their own sheriffs and justices
 administer their own laws
 levy taxes and customs duties
 create fairs and markets
 issue charters
 salvage shipwrecks
 collect revenue from mines
 administer the forests
 mint their own coins

For a period Carlisle was also placed under the bishop's jurisdiction, to protect the north west of England.

Durham's exceptional status reached its zenith by 1300, when Prince-Bishop Antony Beck remarked that:

To ensure that episcopal functions continued to be performed while the diocesan bishop was playing his part in political affairs of state, suffragan bishops were appointed. For instance, Bishop Thomas Langley served as chancellor to the Kings Henry IV, Henry V and Henry VI and was frequently away in London and occasionally overseas.

Demise
In 1536 Henry VIII greatly diminished the Prince-Bishop's secular authority, which was further reduced during and after the English Civil War.

From 1537 to 1572, there was one suffragan Bishop of Berwick. Since 1572, the see has remained in abeyance, and Berwick-upon-Tweed is now in Newcastle diocese.

After the Union of the crowns of England and Scotland in 1603, the County Palatinate, founded to check Scottish incursions, increasingly became an anachronism.

The palatinate was finally abolished on 5 July 1836. In 1844 the Islandshire exclave was transferred to the jurisdiction of Northumberland, while the Bishop's duty to maintain a major fortress overlooking the Tweed at Norham also came to an end. 1882 saw the Bishop lose the religious leadership for the whole of Northumbria when the part north of the River Tyne became the newly created Diocese of Newcastle. In 1971 the Courts Act modernised the English courts system and abolished the Palatinate courts.

Since 1906, there has again been a suffragan bishop in the diocese – the Bishop of Jarrow.

Still, people born in Bedlington or the other parts of old North Durham, had birth certificates issued with the County Palatine of Durham printed on them, and the North Durham satellite areas governed their areas as Urban District Councils still under the rule of Durham. This prevailed until 1974, when administrative boundaries were changed and all of these areas, and other "autonomous" towns connected to Durham, lost their independence.

Reuse of the title: in March 2016, when announcing the retirement of the assistant Bishop of Newcastle, the new suffragan bishop, when appointed, will have the title Bishop of Berwick.

Seals
To differentiate his ecclesiastical and civil functions, the Bishops used two or more seals: the traditional almond-shaped seal of a cleric, and the oval seal of a nobleman. They also had a large round seal showing them seated administering justice on one side, and, on the other, armed and mounted on horseback. That design was, and still is, used by monarchs as the Great Seal of the Realm.

Coat of arms
As a symbol of his palatine jurisdiction, the Bishop of Durham’s coat of arms was set against a crosier and a sword, instead of two crosiers, and the mitre above the coat of arms was encircled with a coronet, usually of the form known as a ‘crest coronet’ (and which is blazoned as a ‘ducal coronet’ though not actually the coronet of a duke). Although the jurisdiction was surrendered to the Crown in 1836, these heraldic symbols of their former power remain.

Bishop's Palace 
The bishop's palace is Auckland Castle in Bishop Auckland. Until the 1830s and the national mood at the time of the Great Reform Act, the Bishop had at least two more castles; Norham Castle in Northumberland and his main Palace at Durham Castle, now occupied by Durham University. The Bishop still has the right to use "his" suite at Durham Castle, although the right he retained to stable his horses in buildings adjacent to Palace Green in Durham has lapsed – it was noted in the preamble to University of Durham Act 1935 that the Bishop no longer kept horses.

Bishops
The diocesan Bishop of Durham, Paul Butler, is supported by the Bishop suffragan of Jarrow, currently Sarah Clark. Alternative episcopal oversight (for parishes in the diocese who reject the ministry of priests who are women) is provided by the provincial episcopal visitor (PEV) the Bishop suffragan of Beverley, Glyn Webster. He is licensed as an honorary assistant bishop of the diocese in order to facilitate his work there. Besides Webster, there are also retired honorary assistant bishops licensed in the diocese: retired Bishop of Salisbury David Stancliffe lives in Stanhope since 2013 (he is also licensed in Europe diocese.)

Archdeaconries and deaneries
The diocese is divided into three archdeaconries, those of Auckland, Durham and Sunderland.

Archdeacons of Sunderland
The archdeaconry of Sunderland was created from the Durham archdeaconry on 1 March 1997 to acknowledge Sunderland's new status as a city. The first archdeacon was Frank White (from 1997 to 2002) who was elevated as Bishop of Brixworth in 2002. He was succeeded by Stuart Bain in 2002, who resigned to become Provost of Sunderland Minster on 17 March 2018. Bain was succeeded by Bob Cooper on 3 July 2018.

Archdeaconries and deaneries

References

External links
Church of England Statistics 2002 
Diocese of Durham

 
1000s establishments in England
Dioceses established in the 10th century
Religious organizations established in the 1000s